Cynthia Breazeal is an American robotics scientist and entrepreneur. She is a former chief scientist and chief experience officer of Jibo, a company she co-founded in 2012 that developed personal assistant robots. Currently, she is a professor of media arts and sciences at MIT and the director of the Personal Robots group at the Media Lab. Her most recent work has focused on the theme of living everyday life in the presence of AI, and gradually gaining insight into the long-term impacts of social robots.

Early life and education 

As the daughter of two scientists, she had early access to the fields of computer science and engineering. Under the guidance of her parents, Breazeal earned a B.Sc in electrical and computer engineering from the University of California, Santa Barbara, in 1989; her M.S. in 1993; and her Sc.D. in 2000 in electrical engineering and computer science, both from MIT. After watching a NASA robot, she decided to switch her focus to social robotics.

She developed the robot Kismet as a doctoral thesis under Rodney Brooks, which looked into the expressive social exchange between humans and humanoid robots. Kismet, as well as other robots Breazeal co-developed while a graduate student at the MIT Artificial Intelligence Lab, can now be seen at the MIT Museum. Notable examples include the upper torso humanoid robot, Cog; and the insect-like robot, Hannibal. In the early 2000s, she worked on Leonard, Aida, Autom and Huggable.

MIT career 
Breazeal is a professor of Media Arts and Sciences at MIT, where she founded and is the current director of the Personal Robotics group within the Media Lab. She has written several books in the field of robotics and has published several peer-reviewed articles on the topic. She also serves on multiple editorial boards for autonomous and various other robotic committees. Growing up and while studying in university, Breazeal found that the issue was that robots too often only interacted with objects and not people. In addition to this, Breazeal found that if we give robots the ability to perform non-verbal cues, such as those that humans inherently do every day, then humans will treat and see robots more like companions and like humans. She also explores the idea of using robots to build better connections between humans, such as humans who live a long distance away from each other.

Breazeal is also the associate director for the Bridge: MIT Quest for Intelligence, where she works on implementing AI through grade school.

Breazeal has centered her work around the concept of "living with AI" which studies the impact of incorporating social robots into our everyday lives. The purpose of adding sentiment to AI is offering support to people, and creating companionship and support in places where there may be none.

In January 2022, Breazeal was named as dean for digital learning at Massachusetts Institute of Technology (MIT). As dean, Breazeal will lead in aiding to grow MIT's online portfolio, libraries, boot camps, and identifying the areas for innovation, while researching opening learning and how different methods and technologies can improve digital learning.

Research 

Leonardo was one of her earliest robots, co-developed with Stan Winston Studio, and a successor to Kismet (recognized in 2006 by Wired magazine as one of the "50 Best Robots Ever"). Leonardo was also used to investigate social cognition and theory of mind abilities on robots with application to human-robot collaboration, in addition to developing social learning abilities for robots such as imitation, tutelage, and social referencing. Next, is another of Breazeal's robots in this tradition, and was named by Time magazine as one of the 50 Best Inventions of 2008. Next is an MDS robot (mobile, dexterous, social) that combines rich social communication abilities with mobile dexterity to investigate more complex forms of human-robot teaming.

Breazeal's Personal Robots group has also done a number of design projects and publications regarding social robots, covering topics such as education, psychology, personalization, and telepresence.
Social robots developed in Breazeal's Personal Robots group include Autom, a robot diet and exercise coach (the PhD thesis of Cory Kidd). It was found to be more effective than a computer counterpart in sustaining engagement and building trust and a working alliance with users. Autom was the predecessor of Mabu (Catalia Health). Breazeal's group has also explored expressive remote presence robots such as MeBot. The physical social embodiment of the MeBot was found to elicit greater psychological involvement, engagement, and desire to cooperate over purely screen-based video conferencing or a mobile screen. There is also the Huggable which was designed as a pediatric companion to help support the emotional needs of hospitalized children and to help support and augment child life specialists.

Breazeal has also been part of creating a robotic flower garden installation, Cyberflora which was exhibited at the 2003 National Design Triennial at the Smithsonian Cooper-Hewitt National Design Museum.

She served as a consultant on the 2001 Spielberg-Kubric movie A.I. Artificial Intelligence.
She also has a prominent role as a virtual participant in a popular exhibit on robots with the traveling exhibit, Star Wars: Where Science Meets Imagination, interacting with a real C-3PO (voiced by Anthony Daniels) as she spoke to the audience through a pre-recorded message displayed on a large plasma flat-screen display.

In 2003, she was named by the MIT Technology Review TR100 as one of the top 100 innovators in the world under the age of thirty-five.

In 2020, she was elected a AAAI Fellow by the Association for the Advancement of Artificial Intelligence.
 
In March 2020, during the SARS-CoV2 pandemic, Breazeal and her team launched a site with over 60 activities, so students can get access to STEM activities from the lockdown to help teachers and parents continue education from home.

Jibo

On July 16, 2014, Breazeal launched an Indiegogo campaign to crowdfund the development of Jibo, a personal assistant robot widely marketed as the world's first family robot. She served as chief scientist and chief experience officer. Jibo reached its initial fund-raising goal and was due to launch in 2015, then later pushed to 2016, before finally being released in November 2017. The robot was created to enable more engaging social experiences, including storytelling and other forms of entertainment.

Jibo generally received poor reviews, being compared to the more powerful and much cheaper Amazon Alexa and Google Home. The software development kit expected for developers was never released. On December 15, 2017 the company announced layoffs and shut its doors soon after. By the time Jibo shut down, it had raised more than $70 million. Breazeal has made no public comments in regard to the closing of Jibo. In March 2020, the assets of Jibo Inc. were acquired by NTT Corporation. NTT Disruption intends to bring Jibo to the healthcare and education markets.

Awards and recognition 
In 2008, she received the Gilbreth Lectures Award by the National Academy of Engineering. Her Nexi robot was named one of Time magazine's Best Inventions of 2008.

In 2014, Breazeal was recognized as an entrepreneur as Fortune magazine's Most Promising Women Entrepreneurs, and she was also a recipient of the L'Oreal USA Women in Digital NEXT Generation Award. The same year, she received the 2014 George R. Stibitz Computer & Communications Pioneer Award for seminal contributions to the development of Social Robotics and Human Robot Interaction.

In 2015, Breazeal was named by Entrepreneur magazine as one of the Women to Watch.

Jibo was featured on the cover of Time magazine's 25 Best Inventions of 2017.

Selected works

Books 

Breazeal contributed one chapter to Architects of Intelligence: The Truth About AI from the People Building It, Packt Publishing, 2018, by the American futurist Martin Ford.

References

Further reading

External links
MIT Cynthia Breazeal Home page
"Profile: Cynthia Breazeal", PBS NOVA scienceNOW TV series, November 21, 2006.

"50 Best Robots Ever", Wired,  January 2006.

American roboticists
Women roboticists
Fellows of the Association for the Advancement of Artificial Intelligence
MIT School of Engineering alumni
MIT School of Architecture and Planning alumni
University of California, Santa Barbara alumni
American women engineers
1967 births
Living people
21st-century American engineers
MIT Media Lab people
21st-century women engineers
American women academics
21st-century American women